ČT2 (ČT Dva, Česká televize 2, "Dvojka") is the Czech public television channel, operated by Czech Television. ČT2 broadcasts documentaries nature-oriented shows, frequently showing foreign films in the original versions with Czech subtitles, including many English-language movies and features some of the important sports events (i.e. Olympic Games, FIFA World Cup or UEFA European Football Championship).

History 
ČST2 launched on 10 May 1970 and was broadcast throughout Czechoslovakia in 1970. In 1973 the channel changed from black-and-white to colour.

Following the full implementation of federalism in Czechoslovakia after the Velvet Revolution, the second channel was split into two "national" channels (1990) and began broadcasting as ČTV in the Czech Republic and as the S1 in Slovakia.

On 1 January 1993, after the dissolution of Czechoslovakia, ČTV changed its name to ČT2, now the second channel of the new Česká televize (Czech Television).

Programs

Series
 Bates Motel (Batesův motel)
 House of Cards (Dům z karet)
The Walking Dead (Živí mrtví)
Light as a Feather (Lehké jako pírko)
 The Night Manager (Noční recepční)
 Red Dwarf (Červený trpaslík)

Formerly broadcast
 Downton Abbey (Panství Downton)
 The Borgias (Borgiové)
 Game of Thrones (Hra o trůny)
 The Simpsons (Simpsonovi)

Sport
 UEFA Europa League
 UEFA Europa Conference League

Documentary
 Alkohol - magický lektvar
 Mayday
 Národní klenoty
 Tajemství 2. světové války

ČT2 HD 

ČT2 HD is the high-definition TV channel from Czech Television. ČT2 HD broadcasts programming from ČT2 via IPTV, digital terrestrial  and satellite (via Astra 3B – DVB-S2 standard).

Previously HD programming was shown on ČT HD, covering ČT1, ČT2 and ČT4.

Logos

See also
Television in the Czech Republic
ČT1
ČT HD
Telecommunications in the Czech Republic

References

External links
Official website
Program TV ČT2

Eastern Bloc mass media
Television stations in the Czech Republic
Television channels and stations established in 1970
Czech-language television stations
Czech Television